El Gamaliya is a city in the Dakahlia Governorate, Egypt. Its population was estimated at about 98,000 people in 2020.

References 

Populated places in Dakahlia Governorate